Acting Crazy is a Canadian television game show. Hosted by Wayne Cox (who previously hosted Second Honeymoon and Talk About), announced by Terry Reid and produced by Blair Murdoch, the show was shot at the U.TV studios in Vancouver and originally aired on the Global Television Network in 1991. It was brought back in 1994, but it was later put into repeat syndication on Global and its sister specialty channel, Prime Television (now known as DTour), both having shown every episode. GameTV aired 26 episodes of the show until it was removed from the channel's schedule in October 2012.

Rules
Each episode of Acting Crazy featured two teams of four, each having one contestant, one celebrity and two "house players" (recurring players hired by the show), playing several rounds. In each round, one member of each team was brought out onto the centre stage and given a charade to act out to his or her team. Those charades are movie titles, song titles, TV shows, famous people, phrases, places, quotes, and often, wildflowers, etc. That person had one minute to successfully communicate to his/her team whatever (s)he was given. The clock counted up from 0 seconds to 1 minute.

The time it took to complete each charade was added to a score for each team, and at the end of the show, the team which had acted out all of its charades in the fastest aggregated time won a prize for its contestant, and the champion would return the next day to defend against a new player. Should the reigning champion win 5 straight games, he/she would receive a chance to select prizes from the "Acting Crazy Galleria" (also referred to by Wayne as "Blair's Prize Emporium" during the 1994 tapings); in addition to winning a regular prize in 1994.

Midway through each episode, the contestants switched teams, taking their times with them, and the last round included a side prize which went to the team who had completed its charade the fastest in that round only. In a few early episodes in the 1991-92 season, the time limit in the final round would be 30 or 45 seconds; otherwise it remained 1 minute for most of the run.

The five house players (of which four would appear on any given show) were Sue Burge, Melody Davies, Gary Jones, Billy Mitchell and Denis Simpson. (Burge and Davies, who are sisters, later competed as one of thirteen teams in the 2001 Travel TV series, The Great Race.) All the house players were contestants on Talk About in 1988/89 which was also hosted by Cox.

Celebrities and contestants on the show stayed at the Century Plaza Hotel in Vancouver in 1991, and the Westin Bayshore Hotel in 1994.

Celebrities who appeared during the 1991–92 tapings
 Nina Blackwood
 Eric Boardman 
 Jack Carter
 Jackson Davies
 Micky Dolenz
 Leslie Easterbrook
 Morgan Fox
 Meredith MacRae
 Rip Taylor
 Jimmie Walker
 Jo Anne Worley

Celebrities who appeared during the 1994 tapings
 Jim J. Bullock
 Billy Davis Jr.
 Jenilee Harrison
 Anna Maria Horsford
 Stu Jeffries
 Larry Linville
 Meredith MacRae
 Marilyn McCoo
 Peter Noone
 Sally Struthers
 Marcia Wallace
 Patrick Wayne

All celebrities appeared for ten shows, except MacRae (twenty shows, ten for each appearance) and McCoo, Davis Jr. and Jeffries (who were in a three-celebrity rotation with one another, each appearing for twenty shows, overall).

External links
 

1991 Canadian television series debuts
1992 Canadian television series endings
1994 Canadian television series debuts
1994 Canadian television series endings
1990s Canadian game shows
English-language television shows
Global Television Network original programming
First-run syndicated television shows in Canada
Television shows filmed in Vancouver
Television series by Blair Murdoch Productions
Television series by Corus Entertainment
Canadian television series revived after cancellation